The 1977 B.R.S.C.C. Trophy was a non-championship Formula Three race, held at the Mallory Park circuit, in Leicestershire, England, on 4 September.  The race saw Stephen South, who won the previous year’s corresponding race (Griffin Golden Helmet Trophy), return to win again.

Report

Entry
A total of just 17 F3 cars were entered for the event, however of those, only 11 took part in qualifying and race. Of those who were entered, but did not arrive included both the Unipart Racing Team’s cars and neither did one for up and coming young English driver, Nigel Mansell.

Qualifying
Stephen South took pole position, with a time of 44.2 secs.

Race
After 20 laps of the Mallory Park circuit, South took the chequered flag, in a time of 15:07.0 mins. averaging a speed of 107.166 mph. Second place went to Mario Pati, who was over 28 secs. behind. Just 0.2 of second separate Pati from Ian Grob who completed the podium. The race however saw four taken out following a startline crash, leaving just seven cars running after Gerard’s, the first corner.

Classification

Race

 Fastest lap: Stephen South, 44.6secs (108.96 mph).

References

British Formula Three Championship